Chmielowice may refer to:

Chmielowice, Opole Voivodeship, Poland
Chmielowice, Świętokrzyskie Voivodeship, Poland